R511 road may refer to:
 R511 road (Ireland)
 R511 road (South Africa)